Andra Samoa is an American Samoan chief executive and environmentalist. She is also involved as a community organizer in Leone and works on several projects to restore coastal environmental areas. She is one of two women serving in the American Samoa Fono in 2019.

Early life 
Samoa grew up in Leone, Tutuila, American Samoa.

Career 
She was the chief executive officer of the American Samoa Power Authority (ASPA) from 2006 to 2013 and led the installation of the country's first solar powered electrical grid. She also managed the country's gas supply and distribution following the withdrawal of ExxonMobil. Samoa has also been chief executive officer of the Pacific eCommerce Development Corporation, which works on various information technology projects.

Samoa has worked in a voluntary capacity for a number of environmental conservation projects, including a local government programme in Leone to encourage the regrowth of coral using indigenous methods. She is also involved in restoring the mangrove swamps and coastal wetlands. In addition, she has organised skills training for villagers in Leone that has been replicated elsewhere in American Samoa. In 2013, she was on hand to accept the donation of plants to the Leone Healing Garden Project with the Leone Empowerment Team. She has also been involved in efforts to help spay and neuter cats and dogs in Leone.

In 2017, she was profiled as one of "70 Inspiring Pacific Women," and had been nominated for the award by individuals at the University of Hawaii, Manoa.

References

Living people
Year of birth missing (living people)
American Samoan businesspeople
American Samoan environmentalists
Chief executives in the technology industry
American women chief executives
20th-century American women
21st-century American women
20th-century American people